Stine Brun Kjeldaas (born 23 April 1975) is a snowboarder from Kongsberg, Norway.

Snowboarding career
She won a silver medal in the half-pipe at the 1998 Winter Olympics in Nagano, Japan, and also participated in the 2002 Winter Olympics in Salt Lake City, United States.

Commentating career
She joined the BBC commentary team for the 2010 Winter Olympics.

Personal life 
Stine Brun Kjeldaas was married to Dutch snowboarder Cheryl Maas. They have two daughters called Lara and Mila.

References

External links 
 

Norwegian female snowboarders
Olympic snowboarders of Norway
Snowboarders at the 1998 Winter Olympics
Snowboarders at the 2002 Winter Olympics
1975 births
Living people
Olympic medalists in snowboarding
Medalists at the 1998 Winter Olympics
Lesbian sportswomen
LGBT snowboarders
Norwegian LGBT sportspeople
Kongsberg IF
Olympic silver medalists for Norway
People from Kongsberg
Sportspeople from Viken (county)
21st-century Norwegian women